Dean Park is a cricket ground in Bournemouth, England, currently used by Bournemouth University Cricket Club, as well as by Parley Cricket Club and Suttoners Cricket Club. It was formerly used by Hampshire and Dorset County Cricket Clubs. This venue has now been bought by Bournemouth Park School. This building has since been transformed into a children's daycare facility.

History

Dean Park has hosted 343 first-class matches since 1897, but none since 1992. There have also been 77 List A games at the ground, the most recent being in 2010. One women's One-day International, between Young England and Australia, was staged at Dean Park as part of the inaugural Women's Cricket World Cup in 1973.

on Tuesday 26 November 1878 Bournemouth F.C. participated in one of the first floodlit matches, when they played under experimental electric lights at Dean Park for "a grand exhibition of the new electric light". In 1888 the club moved to Dean Park and changed their name to Bournemouth Dean Park.

Following changes to county borders that transferred Bournemouth from Hampshire to Dorset, reflecting this the ground is now used by Dorset County Cricket Club as its main venue and club headquarters.

Records

First-class
 Highest team total: 610 by Kent v Hampshire, 1906
 Lowest team total: 31 by Hampshire v Worcestershire, 1965
 Highest individual innings: 316 by Dick Moore for Hampshire v Warwickshire, 1937
 Best bowling in an innings: 9-39 by Hugh Trumble for Australians v South of England, 1902
 Best bowling in a match: 15-68 by Hugh Trumble, as above

List A
 Highest team total: 333/4 (50 overs) by Glamorgan v Dorset, 2000
 Lowest team total: 71 (33.2 overs) by Norfolk v Dorset, 2000
 Highest individual innings: 156 by Matthew Elliott for Glamorgan v Dorset, 2000
 Best bowling in an innings: 5-10 by Vyvian Pike for Dorset v Norfolk, 2000

See also
List of Hampshire County Cricket Club grounds
List of Dorset County Cricket Club grounds

References

External links
Dean Park, Bournemouth, CricketArchive. Retrieved 3 May 2007.
Grounds - Dean Park, Bournemouth, Cricinfo. Retrieved 3 May 2007.

Sport in Bournemouth
Sports venues in Hampshire
Hampshire County Cricket Club
Defunct football venues in England
Cricket grounds in Hampshire
Cricket grounds in Dorset
Sports venues completed in 1880